Henri Simon (born 25 November 1922) is a French Marxist militant, and advocate of Council Communism.

Texts
 Une expérience d’organisation ouvrière. Le Conseil ouvrier|Conseil du personnel des Assurances Générales-Vie, 1957 (réédition 2002).
 Le 25 juin 1976 en Pologne : travailleurs contre capital, Spartacus, 1977.
 (with Cajo Brendel), De l'anti-franquisme à l'après-franquisme. Illusions politiques et lutte de classe, Spartacus, 1979, 172 p.
 Pologne 1980-82, lutte de classes et crise du capital, Spartacus, 1982.
 To the bitter end: Grève des mineurs en Grande-Bretagne (mars 1984-mars 1985)'', Acratie, 1987.

References

1922 births
Living people
French Marxists